Echinosphaeridium is a genus of green algae, in the family Neochloridaceae.

References

Sphaeropleales genera
Sphaeropleales